El-Hadi Laameche (born March 5, 1990) is an Algerian marathon runner. He competed at the 2016 Summer Olympics in the men's marathon but did not finish the race.

References

1990 births
Living people
Algerian male marathon runners
Olympic athletes of Algeria
Athletes (track and field) at the 2016 Summer Olympics
Algerian male long-distance runners
21st-century Algerian people
20th-century Algerian people